DASL (Datapoint's Advanced Systems Language) was a programming language and compiler proprietary to Datapoint.  Primarily influenced by Pascal with some C touches, it was created in the early 1980s by Gene Hughes.

The compiler output was assembly language, which was typically processed through a peep-hole optimizer before the assembler and linker.

Reflecting its name, DASL was used for systems programming, mainly by the vendor itself.

External links & References
The Dasl Document

Systems programming languages